The Visitor (original title Muukalainen) is a 2008 drama film directed by Finnish director Jukka-Pekka Valkeapää. It is a joint production of  Finland, Estonia, Germany, and the UK. 

On 31 August 2008, the film premiered at the Venice Days section of the 65th Venice International Film Festival. Subsequently, it won the Dragon Award and the Nordic Vision Award at the 2009 Göteborg Film Festival, and in 2010, it won two Jussi Awards, one for Best Cinematography and one for Best Editing, while it was nominated for four more. 

The mute boy (Vitali Bobrov) lives in a remote farm with his mother (Emilia Ikäheimo), while his father (Jorma Tommila), a violent person, is in prison. A stranger arrives at the farm (Pavel Liška) and, reluctantly, he is given hospitality. The film brings the viewer close to the winter landscapes of the Finnish countryside through the eyes of the boy.

External links
The Visitor on IMDb
The Visitor on Venice Days 2008

2008 films
2008 drama films
2000s Finnish-language films
Finnish drama films